Chester Dean Burnett (born April 15, 1975) is a former American football linebacker in the National Football League for the Washington Redskins, Jacksonville Jaguars, and Cleveland Browns. He played college football at the University of Arizona and was drafted in the seventh round of the 1998 NFL Draft.

Personal life
Burnett is married to his wife, Jeena, with whom he has three children. 

1975 births
Living people
American football linebackers
Washington Redskins players
Jacksonville Jaguars players
Cleveland Browns players
Arizona Wildcats football players